Jonathan Richardson (born 1804) was an Irish politician.  He was a member of the Quaker Richardson family and a relative of James Nicholson Richardson MP and Jonathan Joseph Richardson MP.

He was elected as a Member of Parliament for Lisburn in 1857, and again in 1859 as a Conservative, resigning in 1863.

Richardson lived at Kirkcassock House, County Down, which was designed by Alfred Waterhouse, ca. 1865.

Arms

References
Parliamentary Election Results in Ireland, 1801-1922, edited by B. M. Walker (Royal Irish Academy 1978)
Who's Who of British Members of Parliament: Volume I 1832-1885, edited by M. Stenton (The Harvester Press 1976)

1804 births
Year of death unknown
Irish Conservative Party MPs
Members of the Parliament of the United Kingdom for County Antrim constituencies (1801–1922)
UK MPs 1857–1859
UK MPs 1859–1865
Whig (British political party) MPs for Irish constituencies